Isabelle Hénault, is a psychologist from the University of Québec at Montréal, Canada.

Dr. Hénault has developed a Relationship and Sex Education Program. She is presently collaborating on numerous international research initiatives involving socio-sexual education and interpersonal relationships. Dr. Hénault is the author of Asperger's Syndrome and Sexuality: From Adolescence through Adulthood.

Books

References

External links
Includes autobiographical information (requires Java).
https://web.archive.org/web/20160213145130/http://clinique-autisme-asperger-mtl.ca/wp/?page_id=143
"Actions Pour l'Autisme Asperger"

Autism researchers
Living people
Year of birth missing (living people)